This is a list of recording artists who have reached number one on Billboard magazine's Alternative Songs chart. Billboard began ranking the chart on the week ending September 10, 1988 (as Modern Rock Tracks), and this is the standard music popularity chart in the United States for play on modern rock radio.

 
The list follows the following principles:
All acts are listed alphabetically.
Solo artists are alphabetized by last name, groups by group name, excluding "a", "an" and "the".
Each act's total of number-one U.S. alternative rock hits is shown after their name.
All artists who are mentioned in song credits are listed here; this includes one-time pairings of otherwise solo artists and those appearing as "featured".
Artists associated with a group who reached number one yet have their own solo page in Wikipedia are not listed here, unless they hit number one as a solo artist.

0–9
3 Doors Down (1)
10 Years (1)
10,000 Maniacs (1)
311 (2)

A

B

C

D
David J (1)
Death Cab for Cutie (2)
Depeche Mode (4)
The Dirty Heads (1)
Dishwalla (1)

E

F

G

H–I

J

K

L

M

N

O
Oasis (2)
Sinéad O'Connor (2)
Of Monsters and Men (1)
The Offspring (3)

P

Q–R

S

T

U–Z

See also 
List of number-one modern rock hits (United States)

References

Alternative